Martín Alberto García (born 2 May 1977) is a professional tennis player from Argentina.

García turned pro in 1996, and has won 8 doubles titles on the ATP Tour during his career. He reached his career high doubles ranking of World No. 21 on 21 May 2001.

ATP Tour finals

Doubles (8 wins, 14 losses)

Notes

External links
 
 
 

1977 births
Living people
Argentine male tennis players
Tennis players from Buenos Aires
21st-century Argentine people